Subota Jović was late 17th century Habsburg military officer of Serbian origin.

In September 1691 units of Serbian Militia from Transylvania commanded by Subota Jović captured Arad. Because Subota Jović distinguished himself during this capture, field marshal Friedrich von Veterani appointed him as Captain of Arad.

See also
Antonije Znorić
Pavle Nestorović Deak
Jovan Monasterlija Komoranac
Pera Segedinac
Vuk Isaković
Jovan Tekelija
Novak Petrović
Pane Božić
Stefan Prodan Šteta
Captain Strahinja

References

Sources 

 
 
 

17th-century Serbian people
Habsburg Serbs
Serbian military leaders
Serbian Militia